Sidi Khelifa is a town and commune in Mila Province, Algeria. At the 1998 census, it had a population of 4505.

References

Communes of Mila Province